Hawthorndon House is a double-storeyed house on Herschel Walk in the suburb of Wynberg in Cape Town, South Africa. The house likely dates from 1683, but was substantially rebuilt in the French Victorian style in 1881 by a Capt. John Spence. It was bought by the Randlord  Sir J.B. Robinson in 1891 and was where he lived until his death in 1927. Count Natale Labia, grandson of J.B. Robinson, donated Hawthornden to what is now the Government of the Western Cape Province in 1978, but will continue to live there during his lifetime.

The site was declared as a national monument in 1983 and became a provincial heritage site in 2000 when the legislation changed.  In 2014 the area protected was extended to include the entire remaining gardens.

Hawthornden is one of the major surviving examples of high style Victorian domestic architecture in Cape Town. It is a private dwelling and is not open to the public.

See also
 List of heritage sites in South Africa
 Heritage Western Cape

References

Buildings and structures in Cape Town
Houses in South Africa
South African heritage sites